Group A of the 2000 Fed Cup Asia/Oceania Zone Group I was one of two pools in the Asia/Oceania Zone Group I of the 2000 Fed Cup. Five teams competed in a round robin competition, with the top team advancing to the Group I play-off, the winner of which would advance to World Group II Play-offs, and the bottom team being relegated down to 2000 Group II.

India vs. Thailand

Kazakhstan vs. Hong Kong

Japan vs. India

Thailand vs. Kazakhstan

Japan vs. Hong Kong

India vs. Kazakhstan

Japan vs. Kazakhstan

Thailand vs. Hong Kong

Japan vs. Thailand

India vs. Hong Kong

  failed to win any ties in the pool, and thus was relegated to Group II in 2002, where they finished second overall and thus advanced back into Group I for 2002.

See also
Fed Cup structure

References

External links
 Fed Cup website

2000 Fed Cup Asia/Oceania Zone